Tea Rose is an Australian-based fashion label owned and operated by designer Rosemary Armstrong. The company was established in 1981 and specializes in formal wear.

Tea Rose has been featured in Australian media such as Vogue (including the 50th Anniversary Edition), In Style magazine, and Madison Magazine. 
Tea Rose took part in Australian Fashion Week in the early nineties.

External links 
Official Site http://www.tearose.com.au
Interview by the Powerhouse Museum
Powerhouse Museum – "Sourcing The Muse"
Swoonbrides.net article
Polkadotbridge.com article
Interview with Rosemary on Style Collective 
Latest look: small but perfectly formed

References 

Australian fashion designers